Geare is a surname.  Notable people with the surname include:

 Michael Geare (1565–?), English sailor, privateer and merchant
 Reginald Geare (1889–1927), American architect

See also
 Gear (name)
 Weare (surname)